RCAF Station Aylmer was a Royal Canadian Air Force airfield that was built between late 1940 and June 1941 northeast of Aylmer, Ontario. It was one of many built across Canada under the British Commonwealth Air Training Plan during World War II.

The first school at the airfield was No. 14 Service Flying Training School (SFTS). RCAF staff began arriving at the station before construction was finished. First to arrive was a 17-man security party under Sgt. Les Oliver in late March.   Squadron Leader T. Moreton, the first officer, arrived on 2 June 1941 to manage the new station's equipment.   Wing Commander Norman Irwin arrived at Aylmer on 18 June 1941 on "Temporary Duty" and was appointed C.O. when the station was activated on 3 July 1941.

Opening ceremonies were held on 2 August 1941 with the Lieutenant Governor of Ontario Albert Matthews and the Premier of Ontario Mitchell Hepburn on hand.   The new station was open to the public that afternoon and guests were treated to an aerobatic display by the instructors.

Relief airfields were R1—Yarmouth Centre, Ontario and R2—Tillsonburg, Ontario.   Pilots used North American Harvards and Avro Ansons as their advanced trainers.  Some North American Yales arrived on 23 January 1942 and were mainly used for navigation exercises. No. 14 SFTS moved to Kingston in August 1944.

Other schools located at Aylmer include:

 Women's Division Service Police School  (1942) 
 No. 1 Flight Engineers' School  (1 July 1944 – 31 March 1945).

Aerodrome information  
The airfield was constructed in a typical BCATP wartime pattern, with six runways formed in an overlaid triangle. Six runways were listed as follows:

Relief landing field – Yarmouth Centre 
The primary relief landing field (R1) for RCAF Station Aylmer was Yarmouth Centre, located east of St. Thomas.  The Relief field was laid out in the standard triangular pattern. 
Three runways were listed as follows:

The Yarmouth Centre airfield now operates as the St. Thomas Municipal Airport.

Relief landing field – Tillsonburg 
The secondary Relief Landing Field (R2) for RCAF Station Aylmer was located north-west of the community of Tillsonburg.  

Postwar 
RCAF Aylmer continued operations after the war's end and was home to a variety of training facilities:
 Technical and Engineering School  (later redesignated No. 1 Technical Training School or TTS)  (April 1945 – May 1955)
 Academic Training School (ATS)  (May 1949  – October 1950) 
 No. 2 Composite Training School  (No. 2 KTS) 
 No. 11 Examination Unit  (September 1951  – November 1952) 
 Aeronautical Engineering School  (June 1952 – November 1953) 
 GCA (Ground Control Approach) School  (1953 – 1957) 
 Fire-Fighting School  (1951 – 1961) 
 Support Services School  (1960)

No. 2 Manning Depot and No. 1 Personnel Selection Unit (PSU) were located at Aylmer from 1949 – 1950.

The station closed in 1961 and the Ontario Police College eventually took over the facilities. All that remains from the RCAF days are 2 hangars, the deteriorating airfield and the taxi area, which is now used as part of the police vehicle driver training track. Outline of one of the former runways exists in what is now Alymer Wildlife Area. A memorial to the former RCAF station sits at the entrance to the Ontario Police College property.

Remembrance

Twelve flying instructors and 26 students lost their lives training at No. 14 SFTS.

RCAF Aylmer scenes

References

External links
 "Harvards Above" by Gananoque Historical Society Retrieved: 2016-11-21

Aylmer
Canadian Forces bases in Canada (closed)
Aylmer
Military airbases established in 1941
Military installations closed in 1961
Military history of Ontario
Military airbases in Ontario
1941 establishments in Ontario
1961 disestablishments in Ontario